Main Street People is the twelfth album by R&B group the Four Tops, released in 1973. It produced three singles, one of which, "Sweet Understanding Love" was the group's last top 40 single in the US for eight years. The album itself did not enjoy the commercial success the group was used to: 'Main Street People didn't do near what it should have done,' Abdul Fakir said in 1982, 'considering the quality of the material.'

Track listing
All tracks composed by Dennis Lambert and Brian Potter; except where indicated

Side A
"Main Street People" (Intro) - (1:42) 
"I Just Can't Get You Out of My Mind" - (3:59)
"It Won't Be The First Time" - (3:53)
"Sweet Understanding Love" (Ivy Jo Hunter, Renaldo Benson, Val Benson) - (3:00)
"Am I My Brother's Keeper" (Len Perry, Renaldo Benson, Val Benson) - (3:25)
"Are You Man Enough?" from the MGM movie Shaft in Africa - (3:24)

Side B
"Whenever There's Blue" - (5:20)
"Too Little, Too Late" - (3:20)
"Peace of Mind" (Abdul Fakir, Huey Davis, Renaldo Benson) - (4:28)
"One Woman Man" (Len Perry, Phil Townsend) - (4:39)
"Main Street People" (3:22)

Personnel
Levi Stubbs (Tracks 2-9 & 11), Lawrence Payton (Tracks 1, 5 & 10) — lead vocals
Renaldo "Obie" Benson , Abdul "Duke" Fakir — backing vocals
Wilton Felder — bass
Paul Humphrey — drums
Ben Benay, David T. Walker, Joe Smith, Larry Carlton — guitars
Chip Crawford, Dennis Lambert, Michael Omartian, Michael Wofford — keyboards
Gary B.B. Coleman, King Ericsson  — percussion
Sidney Sharp - concertmaster
Dennis Lambert, Don Hockett, Gil Askey, Jimmie Haskell - arrangements

References 

1973 albums
Four Tops albums
ABC Records albums
Dunhill Records albums
Albums arranged by Jimmie Haskell